Michael Frederick Carrington Radcliffe (born December 16, 1944) is a lawyer and former politician in Manitoba, Canada. He served as a member of the Legislative Assembly of Manitoba from 1995 to 1999, and was a cabinet minister in the government of Premier Gary Filmon from 1997 to 1999.

The son of Leslie Radcliffe and Edith Bole, he was born in Winnipeg, Manitoba, and holds a Bachelor of Arts degree and an LL.B. from the University of Manitoba. From 1970 to 1996, he was a partner in the firm of Baker, Radcliffe, Murray, Kovnats. Radcliffe was a freemason but is now the Grand Knight for the St. Ignatius Church council (#5808) of the Knights of Columbus. In 1974, he married Linda Anne Leach.

In 1912, Radcliffe's father was planning to travel on what turned out to be the final voyage of the RMS Titanic with his uncle Charles Sedgwick and aunt Adelaide, who were on their way to Mexico City. In the end, because of concerns about safety related to the Mexican Revolution, the uncle made the voyage alone; his body was never found.

In the Canadian general election of 1993, Radcliffe ran as a candidate of the Progressive Conservative Party in the riding of Winnipeg South Centre. The riding was held by Lloyd Axworthy MP at the time, and was considered as safe for the Liberal Party; Radcliffe came in third with only 3,878 votes, against Axworthy's 25,667.

In the provincial election of 1995, Radcliffe ran as a Progressive Conservative in the upscale west-end Winnipeg riding of River Heights. He was successful on this occasion, defeating Liberal Anita Neville (later the MP for Winnipeg South Centre from 2000 to 2011) by 994 votes.

Radcliffe was appointed to cabinet on January 6, 1997, serving as Minister of Consumer and Corporate Affairs with responsibility for the Gaming Control Act. On February 5, 1999, he became the province's Minister of Labour, with responsibility for the Civil Service Act, the Civil Service Superannuation Act, the Civil Service Special Supplementary Severance Benefits Act (1983), the Public Servants Insurance Act and the Workers Compensation Act.

The Progressive Conservatives were defeated by the New Democratic Party under Gary Doer in the provincial election of 1999. The NDP does not have a strong base in River Heights, and Radcliffe would probably not have had difficulty being re-elected under normal circumstances. It was to his misfortune, however, that provincial Liberal leader Jon Gerrard decided to contest the riding. Although the Liberals as a whole ran a poor provincial campaign and lost 10% from their 1995 support level, Gerrard was personally popular enough that he could defeat Radcliffe by 465 votes.

Radcliffe attempted to defeat Gerrard in a rematch in the 2003 provincial election but lost by almost 2,000 votes.

In 2004, Radcliffe was the official campaign agent for Raj Joshi, Conservative candidate in Winnipeg South Centre.

Electoral history

References

Progressive Conservative Party of Manitoba MLAs
1944 births
Living people
Members of the Executive Council of Manitoba